Lukas Kucsera (born 9 September 1991) is a Czech professional ice hockey player. He played with HC Vítkovice Steel in the Czech Extraliga during the 2010–11 Czech Extraliga season.

References

External links

1991 births
Czech ice hockey forwards
HC Vítkovice players
Living people
Sportspeople from Opava
HC Dukla Jihlava players
HC Kometa Brno players
AZ Havířov players
HC Olomouc players